The Monmouth Hawks men's lacrosse team represents Monmouth University in National Collegiate Athletic Association (NCAA) Division I men's lacrosse. Monmouth currently competes as a member of the Metro Atlantic Athletic Conference (MAAC) and plays its home games at Kessler Stadium in West Long Branch, New Jersey. Monmouth made its first NCAA tournament appearance in 2017 and returned to the tournament in 2021.

History

Lacrosse was established at Monmouth in 2012 under coach Brian Fisher and played its first season in 2014.  Monmouth had its finest season in 2017, finishing the year 14-4, and falling to Bryant 10-7 in the NCAA Tournament Opening Round.

Monmouth returned to the NCAA Tournament in 2021 finishing 8-3, winning the MAAC Championship and losing to top seed North Carolina in the NCAA Tournament 1st round.

Season Results
The following is a list of Monmouth's results by season as an NCAA Division I program:

{| class="wikitable"

|- align="center"

†NCAA canceled 2020 collegiate activities due to the COVID-19 virus.

See also
 College men's lacrosse teams in the United States

References

External links
 Official website